The École César-Franck (César Franck School, named after César Franck) was a music school founded in Paris in January 1935 by Guy de Lioncourt, Louis de Serres, Pierre de Bréville and Marcel Labey. It was produced by a split from the Schola Cantorum following a disagreement over the artistic testament of Vincent d'Indy.

History 
This comment by Joseph Canteloube, in his book Vincent d’Indy, reports the incident : 

In fact, the École César-Franck opened its doors at first at the home of M. de Froberville, at number 240, boulevard Raspail. On 9 March it then re-installed itself at number 16, boulevard Edgar-Quinet and, from 1941, at number 3, rue Jules-Chaplain, in the 6th arrondissement of Paris (not far from the rue Stanislas where the first Schola had begun), and finally at number 8, rue Gît-le-Cœur, from 1968.  The establishment closed its doors at the end of the 1980s, after the departure of Charles Brown, its last director.

The title of Schola Cantorum is retained by the school on rue Saint-Jacques.

Role 
Guy de Lioncourt played a major role in the foundation of the César Franck School, acting as its under director, then director in 1942, all the while teaching the composition class. His counterpoint (1914–1931) and music composition (1932–1934) classes at the Schola Cantorum de Paris were formative for a multitude of famous students, as did his classes in composition (1935–1955) and of "déclamation lyrique" (1942–1954) at the César Franck School.

This school trained a large number of talented musicians, among which were Charles Brown, René Benedetti, Jean Pagot, Jeanne Joulain, Éliane Lejeune-Bonnier, Antoinette Labye, Michel and Denise Chapuis, Élisabeth and Joachim Havard de la Montagne, Paule Piédelièvre, Philippe de Bremond d’Ars, Noëlie Pierront, Geneviève de La Salle, Charles Pineau, abbot Pierre Kaelin, canon Louis Aubeux, Roger Calmel, Arlette Mayer-Pize, etc.

List of directors 
 1935–1942: Louis de Serres
 1943–1955: Marcel Labey and Guy de Lioncourt
 1955–1961: René Alix
 1961–1971: Olivier Alain
 1971–c.1985: Charles Brown

References 

Music schools in Paris
Educational institutions established in 1935
1935 establishments in France